Mawdesley is a village and civil parish in Lancashire, England, which had a population of 1,702 at the 2011 Census.

History

The name Mawdesley is thought to have originated in the reign of Edward I (1272–1308). The suffix -ley describes a field, meadow or clearing. Records show that a manor existed in 1250 AD on the site of the present Mawdesley Hall.

Mawdesley Hall is a small hall on a back road leading into the village. It was built by William Mawdesley in 1625, but altered towards the end of the 18th century.

Transport

The village is isolated from public transport services. No main roads pass through the enclave. An infrequent day time bus service runs from the centre of the village to Chorley and Southport. The nearest railway station is three miles away at Rufford.

The local roads are minor back lanes, mostly narrow, unlit, lacking pavements, poorly maintained and generally unsuitable for the high volume of large 4x4 commuter vehicles and heavy farm traffic they now take.

Religion
St Peter and St Paul's Catholic Church, at OS grid reference SD508146, Salt Pit Lane, was founded in 1830. The Wesleyan Methodist church, New Street, was founded before 1893 from religious societies founded by John Wesley and his preachers and was at OS grid reference SD493150. St Peter's CE Church, High Street, Mawdesley with Bispham, was founded in 1839 and is at OS grid reference SD489143.

Education
The village has two small primary schools, Mawdesley St Peter's C of E School, and St Peter and Paul's Catholic School.
Little Acorns Pre-school operates from within Mawdesley St Peter's C of E School and serves Mawdesley and the surrounding villages, providing play-based learning for three to five-year olds.

Geography

The village sits on a low rise from the surrounding flat mossland of Mawdesley Moss. Mawdesley Moss is an extremely flat, industrially farmed, isolated area of mossland. The nearest hill, Harrock Hill (515 ft) belongs to the neighbouring parishes of Hilldale and Wrightington. This low, rolling hill is visible in some areas of Mawdesley and serves as a landmark from the surrounding flat landscape.

Mawdesley is a straggling village, with fragmented areas of residential ribbon development along the various back roads in the parish. As such Mawdesley lacks the clearly defined centre, and sense of place found in neighbouring villages like Croston and Parbold.

Notable residents
Former England and Wales and Lancashire cricketer Jack Iddon was born in Mawdesley in 1902.
Fr. James Mawdsley, FSSP
Thomas J. Cowley, Military major

See also
Listed buildings in Mawdesley

References

Sources
A History of the County of Lancaster: Volume 6 William Farrer & J. Brownbill (editors)

External links

Mawdesley Community Website Mawdesley-village.org.uk.

Geography of Chorley
Villages in Lancashire
Civil parishes in Lancashire